Kate ter Horst MBE (born 6 July 1906, Amsterdam – 21 February 1992, Oosterbeek) was a Dutch housewife and mother who tended wounded and dying Allied soldiers during the Battle of Arnhem. Her British patients nicknamed her the Angel of Arnhem.

Ter Horst was born Kate Anna Arriëns, daughter of Pieter Albert Arriëns and Catharina Maingay. She married Jan ter Horst, a lawyer from Rotterdam, with whom she had six children. One of her daughters, Sophie, still resides in the family home in Oosterbeek.

Second World War
Kate ter Horst witnessed the landings by the British 1st Airborne Division at the beginning of Operation Market Garden on 17 September 1944, noting the event in her diary.

The goal of the operation was for the paratroopers to seize the bridges in and around Eindhoven, Nijmegen and Arnhem. The plan called for the British XXX Corps to advance across these bridges and then push into the Ruhr Valley industrial area of Germany. However, the advance on Arnhem fell behind schedule, and the troops there were forced into a defensive pocket at Oosterbeek.

Captain Randall Martin asked the ter Horsts permission to set up a regimental aid station in their house at the Benedendorpsweg in Oosterbeek.

During the eight days of fighting, ter Horst tended to about 250 wounded British paratroopers herself. Some of her most famous actions in looking after the British troops included walking around her home reading the Bible to dying soldiers and finding water in the most unlikely places (such as the boiler and toilet) when, due to the large concentration of British troops, the house became a target.

Ter Horst wrote about these experiences in a book called Cloud Over Arnhem. Writing the foreword for the book, Arnhem veteran General Sir Frank King noted:

After the war
In November 1947, her eldest son, Pieter Albert, was killed by a leftover anti-tank mine in a meadow along the Rhine.

She starred in Theirs is the Glory, a film made directly after the war about the battle of Arnhem in which survivors were asked to re-enact the parts they played in the battle.

In 1980, the British ambassador to the Netherlands decorated Kate and her husband as Honorary Members of the Most Excellent Order of the British Empire.

In 1992, Kate ter Horst died after she was struck by a car outside her home. Jan died on 1 August 2003 at the age of 98.

Following her death, an Early Day Motion was passed by the British House of Commons paying tribute to Kate ter Horst.

Cultural depictions
Ter Horst narrated the opening montage of the 1977 film A Bridge Too Far in English. In the movie, she is played by Liv Ullmann.

References

1992 deaths
Dutch people of World War II
Female wartime nurses
Women in World War II
People from Amsterdam
1906 births
Honorary Members of the Order of the British Empire
Road incident deaths in the Netherlands
World War II nurses